Ampittia sichunanensis is a species of butterfly in the family Hesperiidae. It was described by Z.G. Wang and Y. Niu in 2002. It is found in China (Eimashan).

References

Butterflies described in 2002
Ampittia